Bač Municipality may refer to:

 Bač, Serbia, a town and municipality in South Bačka District of Vojvodina, Serbia
 Bač, North Macedonia, a village and a former municipality in the southern part of North Macedonia; the municipality was attached to Novaci municipality in 2003

See also

 Bač (disambiguation)